Arambagh Assembly constituency is an assembly constituency in Hooghly district in the Indian state of West Bengal. It is reserved for scheduled castes.

Overview
As per orders of the Delimitation Commission, No. 200 Arambagh Assembly constituency (SC) is composed of the following: Arambagh municipality, and Arandi I, Arandi II, Batanal, Gaurhati I, Gaurhati II, Madhabpur, Mayapur I, Mayapur II, Salepur I, Salepur II and Tirol gram panchayats of Arambagh community development block.

Arambagh Assembly constituency (SC) is part of No. 29 Arambagh (Lok Sabha constituency) (SC).

Members of Legislative Assembly

Election results

1951-1972
Prafulla Chandra Sen won the Arambagh seat in 1972, 1971 and 1969. In a historic contest in 1967 Prafulla Chandra Sen, then the Congress Chief Minister, lost the Arambagh seat to Ajay Kumar Mukherjee of Bangla Congress, who became the new Chief Minister, in the first United Front government in the state. Main factor of Sen's defeat was student agitation there. Students under the leadership of Narayan Ch ghosh had organised farmers, poor people & middle class against Prafulla Chandra Sen.  In 1962 Arambagh had two seats. Prafulla Chandra Sen of Congress won the Arambagh East seat and Radha Krishna Pal of Congress won the Arambagh West seat. In 1957 Radha Krishna Pal of Congress won the Arambagh seat. In independent India's first general election in 1951 Arambagh had twin seats. These were won by Madan Mohan Saha of CPI and Radha Krishna Pal, Independent.

1977-2006
In the 2006,  2001 and 1996 state assembly elections, Binoy Dutta of CPI(M) won the Arambagh assembly seat defeating Bibhabindu Nandi of Trinamool Congress in 2006, Sk. Hasan Imam of Trinamool Congress in 2001, and Abdus Sukkur of Congress in 1996. Contests in most years were multi cornered but only winners and runners are being mentioned. Benode Das of CPI(M) defeated Jalim Singha Roy of Congress in 1991 and Abdul Mannan of Congress in 1987. Abdul Mannan of Congress defeated independent candidate Ranjit Chakraborty in 1982. Ajoy Kumar Dey of Janata Party defeated Madan Kumar Saha of CPI(M) in 1977.

1977

1982

1987

1991

1996

2001

 

.# Swing calculated on Congress+Trinamool Congress vote percentages taken together in 2006.

2006

 

.# Swing calculated on BJP+Trinamool Congress vote percentages taken together in 2006.

2011

 

.# Swing calculated on Congress+Trinamool Congress vote percentages taken together in 2006.

2016

 

.# Swing calculated on Congress+LF vote percentages taken together in 2006.

2021

References

Assembly constituencies of West Bengal
Politics of Hooghly district
1952 establishments in West Bengal
Constituencies established in 1952